The Buick Riviera is a personal luxury car that was marketed by Buick from 1963 to 1999, with the exception of the 1994 model year.

As General Motors' first entry into the personal luxury car market segment, the Riviera was highly praised by automotive journalists upon its high-profile debut. It was a ground-up design on a new GM E platform debuting for the 1963 model year and was also Buick's first unique Riviera model.

Unlike its subsequent GM E platform stablemates, the Oldsmobile Toronado and Cadillac Eldorado, the Riviera was initially a front engine/rear-wheel drive platform, switching to front-wheel drive starting with the 1979 model year.

While the early models stayed close to their original form, eight subsequent generations varied substantially in size and styling. A total of 1,127,261 Rivieras were produced.

The Riviera name was resurrected for two concept cars that were displayed at auto shows in 2007 and in 2013.

Origins

The Riviera name

The name Riviera, Italian for coastline, was chosen to evoke the allure and affluence of the French Riviera. It first entered the Buick line in 1949, as the designation for the new two-door pillarless hardtop, described in advertising as "stunningly smart". The Buick Roadmaster Riviera coupe (along with the Cadillac Coupe de Ville and Oldsmobile 98 Holiday coupe) constituted the first mass production use of this body style, which was to become popular over the next 30 years. Buick added a two-door Riviera hardtop to the Super the following year, the Special in 1951, and the Century upon its return, after a 12-year absence, in 1954.

From 1951 to 1953 the Riviera designation was given to the existing long-wheelbase versions of the four-door Buick Roadmaster and Super sedans. The 1951–53 Buick Roadmaster and Super four-door Riviera sedans feature more standard features, more plush interior trim, and a wheelbase (and overall length) that is  longer than a regular Buick Roadmaster or Super four-door sedan. The 1951–52 Buick Super four-door Riviera sedan is still  shorter in wheelbase and length than the regular Buick Roadmaster and  shorter than the Roadmaster four-door Riviera sedan. In 1953, with the move from the Fireball straight-eight to the more compact Fireball V8 engine, the Roadmaster and Super four-door Riviera sedans became the same length.

In the middle of the 1955 model year, Buick and Oldsmobile introduced the world's first mass-produced four-door hardtops, with Buick offering it only on the Century and Special models, and the Riviera designation was also applied to these body styles. Four-door Riviera hardtops were added to the Roadmaster and Super lines at the beginning of the following model year. However, since it was a body style designation and not a model, the Riviera name does not usually appear on the car.

In 1959, Buick became much more selective in applying the Riviera name. From then until 1962 it only was used to denote a premium trimmed six-window hardtop style which it initially shared exclusively with Cadillac (the Oldsmobile 98 would receive it in 1961) and was available only on the Electra 225. The last usage of the term Riviera to describe a luxury trim level was 1963, as the formal designation of the #4829 Electra 225 Riviera four-door hardtop, the same year the E-body model two-door hardtop coupe Riviera made its debut.

Debut as a personal luxury car

In the late 1950s, GM lacked a personal luxury car to compete with the highly successful Ford Thunderbird—a uniquely styled, two-door that had dramatically increased in popularity when expanded from a two-seater to a four-passenger car and the Chrysler 300C. To fill this gap, an experimental Cadillac design, the XP-715, was created, dubbed the "LaSalle" after a former GM luxury marque. Its angular look was reportedly inspired by GM styling chief Bill Mitchell's visit to London during the period, when he was struck by the sight of a custom-bodied Rolls-Royce. He later said that "knife-edged" styling was what he wanted for the new model, but with a lower profile. The design itself was penned by stylist Ned Nickles.

When Cadillac passed on the venture in 1960 the project was thrown open for competition by the other GM Divisions. Buick, desperate to revive its flagging sales, won the competition by enlisting the aid of the McCann-Erickson advertising agency to create its presentation. Initially referred to as the "Buick LaSalle" and later "Buick Riviera" concept cars, the finished design was adapted to a shortened version of Buick's existing cruciform frame. It was again introduced as a concept car in 1963 called the Buick Riviera Silver Arrow.

First generation (1963–1965)

The production Riviera was introduced on October 4, 1962, as a 1963 model, its distinctive bodyshell was unique to the marque, unusual for a GM product. The design was substantially the same as the original, less expensively hidden headlights concealed in the fender grilles. The elegant ground-up styling sported the new "Coke bottle look" introduced the year before on the arresting Studebaker Avanti, with a tapered midsection surrounded by flaring fenders. There was no trace of the "Sweepspear" used on beltlines of earlier Buicks with the Riviera package.

It rode a cruciform frame similar to the standard Buick frame, but shorter and narrower, with a  narrower track. At , it was about  lighter than either. Power brakes were standard, using Buick's massive "Al-Fin" (aluminum finned) drums of  diameter. Power steering was standard equipment, with an overall steering ratio of 20.5:1, giving 3.5 turns lock-to-lock.

The Riviera's suspension used Buick's standard design, with double wishbones in the front and a live axle located by trailing arms and a lateral track bar in the rear, but the roll centers were lowered to reduce body lean. Although its coil springs were actually slightly softer than other Buicks, the Riviera's lighter weight made its ride somewhat firmer. While still biased towards understeer, contemporary testers considered it one of the most driveable American cars, with an excellent balance of comfort and agility.

Buick's   "Nailhead" V-8 was initially the only available engine, fitted with dual exhaust as standard equipment, and the turbine drive the only transmission. Base price was $4,333 ($ in  dollars ), running upwards of $5,000 delivered with typical options ($ in  dollars ). Buick announced an optional   version of the Nailhead in December 1962. Total production was deliberately limited to 40,000 vehicles (in a year that Buick sold 440,000 units overall) to emphasize the Riviera's exclusivity and to increase demand; only 2,601 were delivered with the delayed availability larger engine in the 1963 model year.

Front leg room was 40.1 inches.

Inside, the Riviera featured a luxurious four-place cabin with front bucket seats and bucket-style seats in the rear. A center console with a floor shifter and storage compartment built into the instrument panel divided the front. Upholstery choices included all-vinyl, cloth and vinyl, or optional leather. A deluxe interior option included real walnut inserts on the doors and below the rear side windows. Extra-cost options included a tilt steering wheel, power windows, power driver's seat, air conditioning, a remote-controlled side-view mirror, and white sidewall tires.

Minimal trim and mechanical changes were made for 1964, with the most identifiable distinguishing features being a raised stylized "R" hood emblem and "R" emblems replacing the Buick crests in the taillight lenses. The interior is distinguished by moving the heater controls from controls under the dashboard eyebrow to slide controls in the forward fairing of the center console. Leather was dropped as an option, and the Dynaflow twin-turbine transmission was replaced by a new three-speed Super Turbine 400. This was a GM Turbo Hydra-Matic. It used a two-speed "D" and 'L" selector, but could automatically downshift from third to second until the car reached a suitable speed to downshift to first. This was the first year of the stylized "R" emblem, a trademark that would continue throughout the remainder of Riviera's 36-year production run. The engine was upgraded to the previously optional   V8. A  'Super Wildcat' version was available, with dual Carter AFB four-barrel carburetors.

In 1965 the  V8 returned as the standard engine, and the "Gran Sport" version made its debut, powered by the Super Wildcat V8, a 360 hp engine equipped with two Carter 625 CFM carburetors, a distributor with different advance, and outfitted with a more aggressive 3.42 axle ratio. A heavy-duty suspension was the separate H2 option but was not part of the Gran Sport option. It offered a quicker ratio steering box and firmer rated springs. The Super Turbine 400 transmission now had a variable pitch torque converter, but was fitted with a three-speed gear selector. Externally, the headlamps, now vertically arranged, were hidden behind clamshell doors in the leading edges of each fender, as had been in the original design. The non-functional side scoops between the doors and rear wheel arches were removed, and the taillights moved from the body into the rear bumper. A vinyl roof became available as an option, offered only in black, and the tilt steering wheel, optional in previous years, was now standard equipment.

Total sales for the 1963 through 1965 model years was 112,244. The Riviera was well received by the motoring press and considered a great success, giving the Thunderbird its first real competition as America's preeminent personal luxury car.

It has since earned Milestone status from the Milestone Car Society. Jaguar founder and designer Sir William Lyons remarked that Mitchell had done "a very wonderful job," and Sergio Pininfarina declared it "one of the most beautiful American cars ever built; it has marked a very impressive return to simplicity of American car design." At its debut at the Paris Auto Show, Raymond Loewy said the Riviera was the most handsome American production car—apart from his own Studebaker Avanti, in his view the Riviera's only real competition for 1963. The first-generation Riviera is considered a styling landmark and has become a collectible car.

Second generation (1966–1970)

The Riviera was redesigned for the 1966 model year. It retained its cruciform X-frame, powertrain, and brakes, but its curvaceous new body was longer, wider, and  heavier. Vent windows, a feature GM had introduced in the 1930s, were absent. Headlamps remained concealed, but now pivoted behind the grille when not in use, and they were once again horizontally arranged. The car's added bulk slowed acceleration with the unchanged 425 engine. The Gran Sport package remained available as an option. Rear seat belts and AM/FM radio were optional.

The new front-wheel drive Oldsmobile Toronado shared the Riviera platform, and, a year later, the also front-wheel drive Cadillac Eldorado; however, the Riviera itself retained the rear-wheel drive layout.

Inside, the four-place cabin with front and rear bucket seats and center console were replaced by a choice of bucket seats or conventional bench seats as standard equipment, making the Riviera a full six-passenger car for the first time. Optionally available was a Strato-bench seat with armrest or Strato bucket seats with either a short consolette or a full-length operating console with a "horseshoe" shaped floor shifter and storage compartment. Both the buckets and Strato-bench seat were available with a reclining seat option for the passenger's side. Sales for 1966 rebounded to 45,308, a new record.

The most significant change for 1967 was Buick's replacement of its venerable 425 "Nailhead" with an entirely new  V8. Gasoline mileage improved slightly, but remained low. Powerful disc brakes with Bendix four-piston calipers became optional for the front wheels but most Riviera continued to be ordered with Buick's highly capable ribbed aluminum brake drums. Cosmetically, changes were few and were limited to the addition of a wide, full-width, center-mounted horizontal chrome grille bar that stretched over the headlight doors and outboard parking lights. Sales eased to 42,799 for the 1967 model year. The Riviera had full instrumentation.

1967 saw the introduction of U.S. mandated safety equipment to improve occupant protection during a crash, including an energy-absorbing steering column, non-protruding control knobs, 4-way hazard flasher, soft interior surfaces, locking seatbacks (on 2-door models), a dual-circuit hydraulic braking system (with warning light), and shoulder belt anchors. The Rivieras complied on all counts and featured the full range of safety features.

1968 models had reshaped loop-type bumpers that surrounded both the vehicle's recessed crosshatch front grille and tail lamps. Hidden wiper arms made their debut. Federally mandated side marker lights appeared, as inverted trapezoids on the lower leading edges of the front fenders, and circular in the rear. The interior was restyled and for the first time shared its instrument panel with the other full-size Buick models. Shoulder belts for front outboard occupants were made standard on all cars built from January 1, 1968. Mechanically, the transmission lost its variable pitch torque converter. A tilt steering wheel was standard. Sales set another new record in 1968, as 49,284 units were sold.

Minor styling changes took place again in 1969, with grilles gaining a pattern of finely spaced, slim vertical bars overlaid by two wider horizontal bars, which jutted forward at their inboard edges. Front marker lights became far shorter and square. Inside, front outboard passengers received new headrests. The ignition switch was moved from the instrument panel to the steering column and locked the steering wheel and selector lever when the key was removed (a security feature that became mandatory for the 1970 model year). Chrome side trim was revised, as well. At the rear, the reverse lights moved from the rear bumper to new three-section tail-light lenses. Sales for 1969 improved again, to 52,872.

The 1970 Riviera was restyled, incorporating design cues from Bill Mitchell's 1968 "Silver Arrow II" concept car. Exposed quad headlamps were nearly flush-mounted, while the new front bumper wrapped around and over the new vertical bar grille, set between the headlamp pods. A newly optional side trim feature accented the large coupe's flowing lines. Skirted rear wheels became standard, with exposed wheels an option. At the rear, a new rear bumper/taillight motif was seen. Despite the fact that 1970 sales dropped to 37,366, the second-generation Riviera proved more successful than the first, with 227,669 units sold over five the years.

Third generation (1971–1973)

The Riviera was radically redesigned for the 1971 model year with flowing and dramatic "boat-tail" styling. Designed under Bill Mitchell's direction, it was penned by Jerry Hirshberg, future head of design for Nissan, mating the two-piece vee-butted fastback rear window, inspired by the 1963 Corvette Sting Ray coupe, to the Riviera's platform.

The design was originally intended for the smaller A-body or its related G-body, as shown by a full scale clay model of an A-body based boat-tail Riviera recently revealed. (Collectible Automobile ran an article about 1971–76 full-sized Buicks in which one sketch design for their 2-door coupes which was rejected resembled the 1971–73 Riviera).

This generation introduced a much more visual representation of the "sweepspear", with a more faithful representation to the version that appeared on 1950s Buicks in both the side molding and beltline. Large, round wheel openings were intended to convey more of a sporty air.

Performance remained reasonably brisk, with a 0–60 mph time of 8.1 seconds for the GS, but the Riviera's sporty image was rapidly fading. One noteworthy advance was Buick's Max Trac limited-slip differential. The 1971 Riviera also features GM's "Full-Flo" ventilation system and two large deck lid louvers are prominent on the trunk lid.

Despite these features, Riviera sales for 1971 dropped to 33,810, the lowest to date. The 1972 Riviera received a new, egg-crate grille, more substantial front bumpers to prepare for the new 5-mph impact legislation, restyled taillight trim, and the louvers were removed from the trunk lid. Sales remained stagnant at 33,728, a drop of 82 from the prior year.

For 1973, the Riviera underwent a number of changes. The front bumper was redesigned to be thicker and featured bumper guards as standard in order to meet 1974 impact-bumper standards, the grille was switched back to horizontal slats, and the front lamps were moved from the bumper and were now integrated into the headlights, wrapping around the corners of the car. Sluggish sales of the third generation Riviera led GM to believe that the boattail deck lid was too radical for most customers' tastes, so in 1973 it was blunted and made slightly shorter. The taillights, meanwhile, were moved down from the sheet metal and into the bumper, and the rear license plate location was moved from the left side of the bumper to the center. This also included a limited-slip differential and a chrome-plated air cleaner. The "Gran Sport" package was still available as a separate option package consisting of a ride-and-handling package that included a rear stabilizer bar, JR78-15 whitewall steel-belted radial tires, a specially tuned "radial roadability" suspension, additional sound insulation and special "Gran Sport" badging. The design changes however only led to a marginal increase in sales, with 34,080 being produced for the model year.

Fourth generation (1974–1976)

Although carrying over the same platform, mechanicals, and some body panels seen on the "Third Generation" Riviera, Buick replaced its distinctive 'boat tail' roofline with a more conventional-looking "Colonnade" treatment which was more in line with its LeSabre and Electra brethren than its front-wheel drive cousins. This turned the car from a hardtop coupe into a pillared coupe, as it featured wide B pillars and fixed quarter opera windows. A landau half-vinyl roof option was available. The car did retain its forward-jutting grille, albeit in a slightly modified form. Thus modified, the car looked far less distinctive than its predecessors, and even its platform mates, the Oldsmobile Toronado and Cadillac Eldorado.

Max Trac was dropped from the option list after 1974 due to a lack of buyer interest. The revised styling did not improve sales, which fell to 20,129 in 1974, although it is impossible to determine how much this was a result of the energy crisis and how much was due to the tame appearance. This generation introduced a novelty that later became federally mandated in a modified form, two high-mounted taillights above the trunk and below the rear window, which was shared on its platform twin the Toronado.

For 1975, the Riviera received an updated front fascia, which lost its forward-jutting theme through the redesign of the fiberglass front end cap. Quad rectangular headlights were mounted horizontally. The new vertical-bar grille echoed the "stand-up" theme that many GM cars of the day incorporated. Parking lights wrapped around the fender sides. The Stage One performance package was dropped for 1975, though the Gran Sport handling package would continue to be offered. Sales for 1975 were 17,306.

Minor changes greeted 1976 models, the most notable of which was a new crosshatch grille insert. The Gran Sport handling package was replaced by an 'S/R' package that had similar sporting pretensions. Sales rallied slightly to 20,082 for 1976.

Fifth generation (1977–1978)

Buick downsized the Riviera for 1977 onto the new smaller GM B platform. While the other E-bodies were front wheel drive since 1966 (1967 for Cadillac's Eldorado), the Buick E platform used a rear-wheel-drive B-body undercarriage (along with the cruciform frame of pre-1965 GMs for the 1966–70 generation). All B-bodies (including C and D platform GM RWDs) were downsized for the 1977 model year which prompted the short-lived 1977/78 generation.

It was, in most respects, a Buick LeSabre coupe with unique styling (with quarter windows mimicking the 1975–78 Cadillac Eldorado). Unlike its LeSabre counterpart, the front fascia is vertical as opposed to slanted. California models had a  Oldsmobile 350.

Sales were up modestly to 26,138 for 1977 and then fell to 20,535 for 1978, although this was a stopgap model until the all-new E-body cars would be ready for 1979. The 1977 and 1978 Rivieras were produced on the downsized GM B platform before the 1979 redesign on the FWD E-platform.

75th Anniversary Package
For 1978, a special "LXXV" edition was released to commemorate Buick's 75th anniversary on the market. Production total was 2,889 and included special silver & black paint with gray leather seats with black trim, four-wheel disc brakes, brushed chrome trim, deep pile carpeting, and special LXXV name plates.

Production Figures

Sixth generation (1979–1985)

The 1979 model year was the debut of the first front wheel drive Riviera, which was also the first front-drive production model in Buick history. Built on a  wheelbase, it once again shared its mechanical design and platform with the Cadillac Eldorado and Oldsmobile Toronado. The Riviera became Motor Trend Car of the Year. Sales more than doubled, to 52,181 for 1979 and 48,621 for the similar 1980 models.

The standard engine was now Buick's   V6, and a new option was an Oldsmobile diesel engine with a mere  offered through 1985. 1982 also saw the first-ever Riviera convertible, although relatively few were built, owing to a high price - US$23,944 ($ in  dollars ). The Riviera convertible was available in only two color choices-white or red firemist with the only interior color of red leather. A twin-turbocharged Riviera convertible was chosen to be the pace car at the 1983 Indianapolis 500, tuned to produce . Most convertible Rivieras had the V8 engine, which saw an increase in rated SAE net HP to 150 for both convertibles and coupes fitted with it from 1982 through the 1985 model year.

In 1983 a special edition of 500 "Riviera XX" was offered, celebrating twenty years since the introduction of the first Riviera (502 were built in the end). These have a special two-tone exterior paint, real wire wheels, a leather, and walnut interior as well as 24-karat gold plated "Riviera XX" badging. The Riviera XX also received a special grille, which then became part of the 1984 model year facelift model. Overall sales made the 1980s Riviera a great success, reaching 65,305 for the 1985 model year.

Production Figures

Seventh generation (1986–1993)

The E-body coupes were converted to unibody construction and further downsized for 1986 to a  wheelbase. It used the Turbo-Hydramatic 440-T4 automatic transmission with a 2.84:1 final drive ratio.

This generation featured the Graphic Control Center (GCC), an advanced electronic instrumentation system which employed a dash-mounted  monochrome touchscreen CRT display. The GCC controlled the vehicle's climate control system and stereo, and also supplied advanced instrumentation such as a trip computer, vehicle diagnostics, and a maintenance reminder feature. Four-wheel disc brakes were standard. With a choice of three suspension packages available, up to the performance-oriented FE3 setting, handling was notably improved. The Riviera placed fourth for Motor Trends 1986 Car of the Year contest. This generation saw the installation of Dynaride, which was an air compressor that would pressurize the rear Chapman Struts to maintain a level overall ride height. A badge was installed on the dashboard to the left of the steering column on all vehicles equipped. It was not available on vehicles equipped with Gran Touring Suspension.

Fuel economy was also notably improved for the 1986 Riviera but the investment in the downsized, transverse engine front wheel drive platform resulted in a substantial price increase to $19,831 ($ in  dollars ) for the base model and $21,577 for the T-Type ($ in  dollars ). The smaller exterior dimensions and lack of a V8 led to sales plummeting to 22,138 for 1986, 15,223 for 1987, and only 8,625 for 1988. 1988 also saw the introduction of Buick's new Reatta coupe, a two-seat personal luxury car.

The Riviera was restyled for 1989, adding  to the overall length (on an unchanged wheelbase). Sales improved to 21,189 for 1989, but dropped to a low of 4,555 for 1993, the abbreviated final model year of this generation. The last 1993 Riviera rolled off the Detroit/Hamtramck Assembly plant line on December 10, 1992.

Production Figures:

Eighth generation (1995–1999)

After a hiatus in 1994, the Riviera returned in 1995 with radical styling that departed from the previous generations' traditional image. Rivieras were now built in Orion Township, Michigan, riding the same Cadillac-derived G platform as the 4-door Oldsmobile Aurora. The first of 41,422 Rivieras made in 1995 rolled off the assembly line on May 23, 1994.

1997 saw suspension revisions, removing excess weight. An upgraded 4T65E-HD transmission featuring a larger  torque converter and heavy-duty gearbox were added. 18,827 were made in 1997.

For 1998, the  supercharged V6 became standard. GM's OnStar service was added as an option, along with minor interior design changes and features including passenger heated seats. A total of 10,953 units were produced for 1998.

With sales of all coupes declining in the North American market, GM decided to discontinue the Riviera. 1999 was the car's last model year with production of 1,956 cars ceasing on November 25, 1998. The final 200 cars had special silver paint and trim, and were denoted "Silver Arrow" models, a designation which hearkened back to several Silver Arrow show cars that had been built off Riviera bodies by Bill Mitchell.

Eighth-generation Rivieras received the most powerful V6 Buick engine since the Grand Nationals of the 1980s. Supercharged Rivieras achieved a fuel efficiency figure of 18/27 (city/highway mpg).

Production Figures:

Engines

Concept cars

2007 concept

At the 2007 Shanghai Motor Show, Buick debuted a concept coupe named Riviera, based on the GM Epsilon II platform. The concept was later shown at the 2008 North American International Auto Show.

It was designed by the Pan Asia Technical Automotive Center (PATAC). The design was inspired by classic Buicks, ancient Chinese artifacts, and modern electronic icons. It includes "icy green" backlighting, Shell Blue body, gull-wing doors, a 2+2 seating configuration, and 21-inch 10-spoke forged aluminum wheels.

2013 concept

Another concept Riviera was shown at the 2013 Shanghai Motor Show, again developed by the Pan Asia Technical Automotive Center PATAC. It has gull-wing doors and a plug-in electric driveline as well as four wheel steering, electromagnetically controlled suspension with air springs, built in 4G LTE connection, transparent A pillar and wireless charging.

References

Works cited
 Gunnell, John, ed.: Standard Catalog of American Cars: 1946–1975, 4th ed., Iola, Wisconsin: Krause Publications, 
 Flammang, James M., ed.: Standard Catalog of American Cars: 1976–1999, 3rd ed., Iola, Wisconsin: Krause Publications,

External links

 Riviera Owners Association
 Riviera Performance — discussion board
 1971–1973 Buick Riviera - Boattail — pictures and information

1960s cars
1970s cars
1980s cars
1990s cars
Riviera
Coupés
Front-wheel-drive vehicles
Motor vehicles manufactured in the United States
Rear-wheel-drive vehicles
Cars introduced in 1963
Personal luxury cars